Sygma (formally known as Agence Presse Sygma or Sygma Photo News) was a French photo agency. Sygma was established in 1973, was acquired by Corbis in 1999, and went bankrupt in 2011. It was one of the largest and leading photo agencies, with offices in Paris, London and New York City, and about 500 photographers under contract.

Sygma's archive of 50 million objects is stored at the Sygma Preservation and Access Facility in Garnay near Paris.

History

It was one of the largest and leading photo agencies, with offices in Paris, London and New York City, and about 500 photographers under contract.

It was acquired by Bill Gates' Corbis in 1999 and the new organisation was called Corbis Sygma.

Sygma declared bankruptcy and shut down operations in 2011 when it could not afford to pay damages resulting from a court case.

Members of Sygma (1973–1999)

Sygma Preservation and Access Facility
Sygma's archive includes 50 million objects from the second half of the 20th century. It is stored at the Sygma Preservation and Access Facility, a dedicated facility in Garnay, near Paris, established in 2009.

References

Further reading
40 Ans de Photo-journalisme, Génération Sygma. Paris: Martinière, 2013. By Michel Setboun, Marie Cousin, et al. .

External links
"PAN Special Report: The Sygma Preservation and Access Facility"
"Stock Agency • Corbis: facility near Paris ensures the preservation of the extraordinary Sygma photo collection of over 800,000 photographs"

Organizations established in 1973
1973 establishments in France
Photography companies of France
Photojournalism organizations
Photo agencies
Photo archives in France
French journalism organizations